New Family Theater is a historic movie theater located at Mount Morris in Livingston County, New York, United States. It was constructed in 1938–1939 and is an outstanding example of the Art Deco style.  The building features linear decorative motifs, curvilinear forms, and bold colorations that appear on the building facade, interior walls of the lobby and auditorium, and in the original light fixtures.

It was listed on the National Register of Historic Places in 1997.

References

External links
New Family Theater - Mt. Morris, NY - U.S. National Register of Historic Places on Waymarking.com

Cinemas and movie theaters in New York (state)
Art Deco architecture in New York (state)
Theatres completed in 1939
Buildings and structures in Livingston County, New York
Theatres on the National Register of Historic Places in New York (state)
National Register of Historic Places in Livingston County, New York